Abou Mamadou Sow (born 12 July 1947) is a Senegalese sprinter. He competed in the men's 4 × 400 metres relay at the 1972 Summer Olympics.

References

1947 births
Living people
Athletes (track and field) at the 1972 Summer Olympics
Senegalese male sprinters
Olympic athletes of Senegal
Place of birth missing (living people)